Limbe or Limbé may refer to:

Places
 Limbe, Cameroon, a seaside city in the South West Region of Cameroon
 Limbé Arrondissement, an arrondissement in the Nord department of Haiti
 Limbé, Nord, a commune in the Limbé Arrondissement
 Rivière du Limbè, a river in Haiti
 Limbe, Malawi, a town

Schools
 Government High School (GHS) Limbe, Cameroon
 Government Bilingual High School Limbe, Cameroon

Other uses
 Limbe (instrument), a type of flute in traditional Mongolian music - see List of Mongolian musical instruments

See also
 Limb (disambiguation)